Froland is a small village in Froland municipality in Agder county, Norway. The village is the site of Froland Church, the main church for the municipality. The Arendalsbanen railway line runs through the village, stopping at Froland Station.

References

Villages in Agder
Froland